Hamish Thomas Umphelby Jamieson is an Australian retired Anglican bishop.

Early life 
Hamish Jamieson was born on 15 February 1932 and educated at Sydney Church of England Grammar School, St Michael's House (Society of the Sacred Mission), Crafers, South Australia, and the University of New England (Australia).

Religious life 
Jamieson was ordained in 1956. He was a member of the Bush Brotherhood of the Good Shepherd from 1957 to 1962 when he became rector of Darwin, a post he held for five years. He was then a Royal Australian Navy chaplain until 1974 when he became the Bishop of Carpentaria (covering the north of Queensland and all of the Northern Territory) with his consecration as a bishop on 1 November at St John's Cathedral (Brisbane)).

A decade later he was translated to Bunbury, retiring in 2000.

References

People educated at Sydney Church of England Grammar School
University of New England (Australia) alumni
Anglican bishops of Carpentaria
Anglican bishops of Bunbury
20th-century Anglican bishops in Australia
21st-century Anglican bishops in Australia
1932 births
Living people
Australian military chaplains
Royal Australian Navy chaplains